Steven Thomas (born July 12, 1967) is an American racing driver and attorney at the TAFS law firm. As a gentleman driver, Thomas has competed in endurance events such as the FIA World Endurance Championship, WeatherTech SportsCar Championship, IMSA Prototype Challenge and Michelin Le Mans Cup.

Career 
In 2021, Thomas had entered the WeatherTech SportsCar Championship with his team, WIN Autosport, using an Oreca 07 in the LMP2 category with Tristan Nunez as his team-mate. Thomas Merrill had competed with the crew during endurance races and Matthew Bell for the 24 Hours of Daytona.

In 2022, Thomas continued his commitment to the WeatherTech SportsCar Championship but for that season, he joined the American team PR1/Mathiasen Motorsports to compete in an Oreca 07 in the LMP2 category with team-mate Jonathan Bomarito. Josh Pierson had competed with the crew during endurance races and Harry Tincknell for the 24 Hours of Daytona. At the same time, Thomas was in discussion with various teams to participate in the 24 Hours of Le Mans. One of them, Algarve Pro Racing, who were in a very difficult situation because following the withdrawal of G-Drive Racing from the FIA World Endurance Championship, which it had to support technically, it found itself without a program and its existence was threatened. It was then that Algarve offered Thomas to participate in the WEC instead of only participating in the 24 Hours of Le Mans. In view of the situation and after consulting his partners, Thomas committed himself and participated in the WEC with drivers James Allen and René Binder as teammates. At the 2022 24 Hours of Le Mans, Allen, Binder and Thomas finished first in the LMP2 Pro/Am subclass.

Racing record

Complete IMSA SportsCar Championship results
(key) (Races in bold indicate pole position; results in italics indicate fastest lap)

† Points only counted towards the Michelin Endurance Cup, and not the overall LMP2 Championship.
* Season still in progress.

Complete FIA World Endurance Championship results

* Season still in progress.

Complete 24 Hours of Le Mans results

References

External links

1967 births
Living people
20th-century American lawyers
21st-century American lawyers
California lawyers
People from East Point, Georgia
Racing drivers from Atlanta
Racing drivers from Georgia (U.S. state)
American racing drivers
24 Hours of Daytona drivers
24 Hours of Le Mans drivers
FIA World Endurance Championship drivers
24H Series drivers
SCCA National Championship Runoffs participants
Le Mans Cup drivers
WeatherTech SportsCar Championship drivers
TDS Racing drivers